The 2002 European Judo Championships were the 13th edition of the European Judo Championships, and were held in Maribor, Slovenia from 16 May to 19 May 2002.

Medal overview

Men

Women

Medals table

Results overview

Men

60 kg

66 kg

73 kg

81 kg

90 kg

100 kg

+100 kg

Open class

Women

48 kg

52 kg

57 kg

63 kg

70 kg

78 kg

+78 kg

Open class

References

External links
 
 

 
E
Judo Championships
European Judo Championships
International sports competitions hosted by Slovenia
Sport in Maribor
Judo competitions in Slovenia